Papaver dahlianum, commonly called the Svalbard poppy, is a poppy species common on Svalbard, north-eastern Greenland and a small area of northern Norway. It is the symbolic flower of Svalbard. Some sources regard this species as part of Papaver radicatum.

It grows to 10–25 cm high, and has long-petiolated basal leaves forming a rosette; the leaves are pinnately dissected and coarsely hirsute. The flowering stems are slender, often arcuate, hirsute. The flower is 2–4 cm in diameter, with four yellow or white, slightly undulate petals, and two boat-shaped sepals, which are densely hirsute with dark brown hairs. The fruit is an obovoid capsule covered with stiff hairs, containing numerous seeds.

The poppy grows on gravel, roadsides, scree sleeps and ledges, and holds the altitude record for flowering plants in Svalbard. 

Despite the extreme northern latitude of the Svalbard poppy, if accepted as a separate species, Papaver radicatum is the most northerly growing plant known to the world, being found on Kaffeklubben Island.

References

dahlianum
Flora of the Arctic
Flora of Norway
Flora of Svalbard
Flora of Greenland